Carissa is a genus of shrubs or small trees native to tropical and subtropical regions of Africa, Australia and Asia. Until recently about 100 species were listed, but most of them have been relegated to the status of synonyms or assigned to other genera, such as Acokanthera.

Description 
Different species of Carissa grow as shrubs or trees, attaining respective heights of 2 to 10 m tall. They bear smooth, sharp thorns that often are formidable; they are true botanical thorns, being modified branches, morphologically speaking. The thorns may be simple, as in Carissa spinarum, dichotomously forked as in Carissa bispinosa, or dichotomously branched as in Carissa macrocarpa.

The leaves are a rich, glossy, waxy green, smooth, simple, entire and elliptic to ovate or nearly lanceolate. They are 2–8 cm long, partly depending on the species, and generally are thick and leathery. In suitable climates some species flower through most of the year. The flowers are nearly sessile, 1–5 cm diameter, with a five-lobed white or pink-tinged corolla. They may be solitary or borne in clusters in an umbel or corymb. The flowers of some species some have a fragrance reminiscent of Gardenia, which adds to their popularity as garden plants. The fruit is a plum-like berry in the shape of a prolate spheroid, like that of a rugby ball. In colour they vary according to species. In some species they are red when ripe, whereas  others turn a glossy purple-black. Typically they are 1.5–6 cm in length, and usually contain 1-4 flat brown seeds, but up to 16 in some species.

Fruit
The fruit of the carissa is an oblong berry which contains numerous small seeds.  The green fruit is poisonous, sometimes dangerously so. The ripe fruit are edible, but may be fairly tart, though some species have fruity flavours with overtones of strawberry or apple. They are rich in Vitamin C, calcium, magnesium and phosphorus. The fruit of C. macrocarpa are especially relished and eaten raw or used to make jelly. Various birds eat Carissa fruit and distribute the seed. 

Carissa carandas is grown in several Asiatic countries for its fruit, which is variously used in cooking and in folk medicine (see article).

Horticulture
Carissa species generally respond well to gardening and are valued in topiary and in forming strong, dense, decorative, thorny, flowering hedges. Some sprawling varieties are useful as ground covers.
Carissa species are grown from seed or cuttings and tolerate slight frost.

Species
The following species are recognised.
 Carissa bispinosa  (L.) Desf. ex Brenan  - widespread in E + S Africa from Kenya to Cape Province
 Carissa boiviniana  (Baill.) Leeuwenb.  - Madagascar
 Carissa carandas  L.  - India, Bangladesh; naturalized in S China, Mauritius, Nepal, Pakistan, Indochina, Java, Philippines, West Indies
 Carissa haematocarpa (Eckl.) A.DC. - Namibia, Cape Province of South Africa
 Carissa macrocarpa  (Eckl.) A.DC.  - Kenya + Zaire south to Cape Province; naturalized in S China, Ascension Island, Hawaii, Florida, Texas, Mexico, Central America, West Indies 
 Carissa pichoniana  Leeuwenb.  - Madagascar
 Carissa spinarum  L.  - Africa, Arabian Peninsula, Indian Subcontinent, Indochina, New Guinea, New Caledonia, Australia
 Carissa tetramera  (Sacleux) Stapf  - E + S Africa from Kenya to KwaZulu-Natal

Formerly included
 Acokanthera oblongifolia (Hochst.) Codd (as C. oblongifolia Hochst.)
 Acokanthera schimperi (A.DC.) Benth. & Hook.f. ex Schweinf. (as C. schimperi A.DC.)

References 

 
Apocynaceae genera
Fruits originating in Africa
Plants used in bonsai